is a city in Aichi Prefecture, Japan. , the city had an estimated population of 69,687 in 29,477 households, and a population density of 4,017 persons per km².

Geography

Kiyosu is located in far western Aichi Prefecture, in the western portion of the Nōbi Plain on the Shōnai River. It is bordered by the Nagoya metropolis to the east. Most of the city has an altitude of under 10 meters above sea level.

Climate
The city has a climate characterized by hot and humid summers, and relatively mild winters (Köppen climate classification Cfa).  The average annual temperature in Kiyosu is 15.8 °C. The average annual rainfall is 1688 mm with September as the wettest month. The temperatures are highest on average in August, at around 28.1 °C, and lowest in January, at around 4.4 °C.

Demographics
Per Japanese census data, the population of Kiyosu has grown steadily over the past 60 years.

Surrounding municipalities
Aichi Prefecture
Ichinomiya
Inazawa
Kitanagoya
Ama
Nagoya
Nishi-ku
Nakamura-ku

History

Middle Ages
Kiyosu was the location of a post town (Kiyosu-juku) on the junction of the Nakasendō and the Minoji connecting Kamakura with Kyoto and the Ise Shrine during the Kamakura period.

In the Muromachi period, the area was fortified with the construction of Kiyosu Castle, which subsequently became a stronghold of the Oda clan and the base from which Oda Nobunaga consolidated his control over Owari Province during the Sengoku period.

Early modern period
After the start of the Edo period, Kiyosu Castle was dismantled by order of Tokugawa Ieyasu, and most of the population relocated to Nagoya.

Late modern period
By the start of the Meiji period, the area was a rural area organized into villages within Nishikasugai District of Aichi Prefecture.
The town of Kiyosu was proclaimed on August 1, 1889, with the establishment of the modern municipalities system..

Contemporary history
The city of Kiyosu was established on July 7, 2005, from the merger of the former town Kiyosu with the towns of Shinkawa and Nishibiwajima (all from Nishikasugai District).

On October 1, 2009, the neighboring town of Haruhi (also from Nishikasugai District) was merged into Kiyosu.

Government

Kiyosu has a mayor-council form of government with a directly elected mayor and a unicameral city legislature of 22 members. The city contributes two members to the Aichi Prefectural Assembly.  In terms of national politics, the city is part of Aichi District 5 of the lower house of the Diet of Japan.

External relations

Twin towns – Sister cities

International
Jerez de la Frontera（Andalusia, Spain）
since January , 1994

Economy
Kiyosu is a regional commercial center with a mixed economy. Due to its proximity to the Nagoya metropolis, it is increasingly becoming a bedroom community.

Education

College
The Aichi Medical College for Physical and Occupational Therapy is also located in Kiyosu.
Aichi Medical College for Physical and Occupational Therapy

Schools
Kiyosu has eight public elementary schools and four public junior high schools operated by the city government, and two public high schools operated by the Aichi Prefectural Board of Education.

Transportation

Railways

Conventional lines
 Central Japan Railway Company
Tōkaidō Main Line：-  –
 Meitetsu
Nagoya Main Line：-  –  –  –  –  –  –
Inuyama Line：-  –
Tsushima Line： –

Roads

Expressway
 Nagoya Dai-ni Kanjo Expressway
 Route 6 (Nagoya Expressway)
 Route 16 (Nagoya Expressway)

Japan National Route

Local attractions

Kiyosu Castle
site of Odani Castle
Kaigarayama Shell Midden, National Historic Site

Notable people from Kiyosu
Yoshio Ishida, professional go player
Ai Kato, actress and model
Akira Toriyama, manga, game artist and character designer. The creator of Dragon Ball.

References

External links

  

Cities in Aichi Prefecture
Kiyosu, Aichi